Big Bear Mountain is an upcoming steel roller coaster at Dollywood in Pigeon Forge, Tennessee. The roller coaster is themed on finding a bear named Big Bear.

History 
On August 5, 2022, Dolly Parton and Dollywood officially announced the US$25 million roller coaster named Big Bear Mountain for the Wildwood Grove section of the theme park with a planned opening of spring 2023. Track for the attraction arrived the following month in September, and trains for the attraction were officially unveiled at the International Association of Amusement Parks and Attractions (IAAPA) Expo on November 15, 2022.

Characteristics

Track 
The color of the track is orange with green supports.

Theme 
The theme for the ride is based on the legend of a black bear named Big Bear roaming Wildwood Grove that has never been seen. An explorer is tasked to finding Big Bear and brings riders along in an SUV.

References

External links 

 Official website
 

Steel roller coasters
Dollywood
Roller coasters manufactured by Vekoma
Roller coasters in Tennessee
Roller coasters planned to open in 2023